Elephant Ridge is a sharp curved ridge in Antarctica, orientated generally west–east, and extending for about , with the highest point at the center rising to . Uranus Glacier forms the southern boundary of the feature. Elephant Ridge is referred to as "Man Pack Hill" in scientific reports in the early 1960s, and is locally known descriptively as "The Elephant". The summit resembles an elephant's head, with the ridge forming the trunk.

References 

Ridges of Palmer Land